The  singles Tournament at the 2007 Internazionali Femminili di Palermo took place between 16 and 22 July on outdoor clay courts in Palermo, Italy. Ágnes Szávay won the title, defeating Martina Müller in the final.

Seeds

Draw

Finals

Top half

Bottom half

References
 Main Draw

2007 Singles
Internazionali Femminili di Palermo - Singles